The Southern Fulton School District is a public school district serving parts of Fulton County, Pennsylvania. It encompasses the rural townships of Belfast, Bethel, Brush Creek, Thompson, and Union, as well as Valley-Hi Boro. The district  encompasses approximately 211 square miles. According to 2000 federal census data, it serves a resident population of 5,143.The district provides a taxpayer-funded preschool program that is open to children who will be 3 or 4 years old before September 1. The program began in 2008.

Schools
 Southern Fulton Elementary School - Grades Pre K–6
 3072 Great Cove Rd.Warfordsburg, Pennsylvania 17267
Southern Fulton Jr../Sr. High School - Grades 7-12
 13083 Buck Valley RoadWarfordsburg, Pennsylvania 17267

Extracurriculars
The district's students have access to a variety of clubs, activities and sports.

Athletics
 Baseball - Class A
 Basketball - Class A
 Cross Country - Class AA
 Boys Soccer - Class A
 Softball - Class A
 Track and Field - Class AA
 Volleyball - Class A

References

External links
 Southern Fulton School District
 PIAA

School districts in Fulton County, Pennsylvania